Ali bin Saeed bin Samikh Al-Marri (Arabic: علي بن سعيد بن صميخ المري) is a Qatari human rights figure and politician born on November 30, 1972. He was appointed Minister of Labour of the State of Qatar on October 19, 2021. Before taking up the ministerial portfolio, he had chaired the National Human Rights Committee (NHRC) for State of Qatar since 2009. He also served as Acting President and Secretary-General of the Global Alliance of National Human Rights Institutions and as President of the Arab Network of National Human Rights Institutions. In 2012 he was elected chairman of the Permanent Arab Committee on Human Rights of the Arab League and Chairman of the Asia Pacific Forum for the session 2013 to 2015. He was re-elected as Chairman of the NHRC of the State of Qatar in 2019.

Education 
Dr. Ali Bin Samikh Al-Marri holds a Ph.D. in political science in 2006, a MA of Political Science in 2002 and a Bachelor of Political Science in 1997.

Career 
He has been engaged with human rights and humanitarian work through field and functional work, as he has a long expertise in international circles regarding protection and promotion of human rights at both local and international levels, which has contributed to Qatar's accession to a number of conventions, protocols and charters related to human rights during his tenure as the Chairman of The National Human Rights Commission.

On the other hand, he was concerned with ​​institutional work of Human Rights field, especially with regard to the importance of the Global Alliance of National Human Rights Institutions (GANHRI) and enhancing its role. During his tenure, he also used to accredit national human rights institutions to the Sub-Committee on Accreditation of the GANRHI in accordance with its commitment to the Paris Principles of human rights standards.

Positions 

 Dr. Ali bin Saeed bin Samikh Al Marri is the current Minister of Labour in Qatar.
 President of the Arab Network for National Human Rights Institutions: June 2021 - October 2021 session. He was elected during the 17th General Assembly of Arab Network of National Human Rights Institutions.
 Secretary-General of the Global Alliance of National Human Rights Institutions: 2018 - 2021.
 Vice President of the GANRHI: 2018 - 2021.
 This happened during the General Assembly Meeting of the GANRHI on Tuesday, 5 February 2019 at the Palace of Nations in Geneva, following electing Dr. Al Marri as the vice-president, Secretary-General and member of the Executive Bureau of the GANRHI.
 Chairman of the National Human Rights Committee (NHRC): 2009 - 2021. Dr. Al Marri has been the Chairman of the NHRC for the past 12 years.
 President of the Arab Network for National Human Rights Institutions from 2012 to 2021.
 Vice President of the Asia Pacific Forum (APF) of National Human Rights Institutions: 2015–2017.
 Chairman of the Sub-Committee on Accreditation (SCA) of the GANHRI: 2012–2015. According to the recent statement of the NHRC, The Sub-Committee on Accreditation (SCA) of the International Coordinating Committee of National Human Rights Institutions has decided to re-elect Dr. Ali bin Smaikh Al Marri, Chairman of Qatar NHRC as President of the committee for the third time.
 President of the APF of National Human Rights Institutions: 2013–2015. This is backed up by the APF happened in Morocco of the year 2014. During his time which he mainly addressed the initiatives for protecting and promoting the rights of women.
 Chairman of the Permanent Arab Human Rights Committee of the League of Arab States: 2012-2014 During his term, Dr. Ali have made major efforts to ensure that the Arab League has an organized and achieved its objectives clearly.
 Vice-chairman of the Committee of Arab Human Rights Panel of Experts in the Arab League: 2008–2009.
 Vice Chairman of the NHRC in the State of Qatar: 2007–2009. One of the book being published under the regulation of Dr. Al Marri discussing the labor law in Qatar.

Memberships 
He is a member of several committees concerned with human rights, such as the National Human Rights Committee, the Executive Bureau of the Global Alliance of National Human Rights Institutions, the executive committee of the Arab Network for National Human Rights Institutions, the Arab Political Science Network (APSN), and the Alumni Association of the Faculty of Economics and Political Science. He is also a member of the advisory board of the Democracy and Human Rights Program, the Arab Elections Network, and the International Committee of Civil Society Organizations.

Al-Marri's books 

 "Majlis Al Tawoon Al Khaliji: Azmat Al Hader Wa Tahadiyyat Al Mustaqbal" - The Gulf Cooperation Council: present crises and future challenges.
 "At-Tahawul Al Demoktari fi Dawlat Qatar" - Democratic Transition in the State of Qatar.

Research 
Dr. Ali Bin Samikh Al-Marri has written a number of research papers on human rights, including "Philosophical Thought and the Values of the Major Revolutions as a Source of Human Rights", "Eliminating Child Labour by Applying it to Some Arab States", "The Principle of The Prohibition of Forced Labour", "International Protection of Human Rights During Armed Conflicts and Under Occupation", "The Impact of International and Regional Transformations on The Gulf Cooperation Council", "The Legal Status of Jerusalem", "Sierra Leone From Slavery to The Civil War", "Egyptian-Sudanese Water Relations", "State Functions Under Individualist Direction", "The Determinants of Qatar's Foreign Policy" and "The Political and Constitutional Development of The State of Qatar Under The Permanent Constitution".

Al-Marri's role in the Qatar blockade 
Al-Marri's role emerged in light of the blockade imposed by Saudi Arabia, the UAE, Bahrain and Egypt on Qatar on June 5, 2017, through his great efforts on the human rights level. Acting as the Chairman of the National Human Rights Committee, he adopted regional and international moves to explain the catastrophic effects of the blockade, through communication with international governmental and non-governmental organizations and delivering press statements about the blockading states, in addition to participating and holding many international conferences that would document the repercussions of the blockade.

During blockade he led various communications, through an array of international forums, calling for the necessity of immediate action to end the suffering of those affected by the blockade imposed on Qatar, and urging human rights organizations, regional and international organizations and other parties to assume their responsibilities to stop the blockade against Qatar.

See also 
Bin Samikh Tower

References 

Portal:Politics, Portal:Biography

Government ministers of Qatar
Qatari human rights activists
1972 births
Living people